Fifty Roads to Town is a 1937 American romantic comedy film directed by Norman Taurog and starring Don Ameche and Ann Sothern. The film is based on a book of the same name by author Frederick Nebel. This is the third novel Nebel wrote.

Plot

Two cases of mistaken identity complicate matters when a woman he believes to be a process server comes across a man she believes to be a criminal.

A warrant out on him, Peter Norstrand flees his New York City home and heads north. Hiding out, he is spotted by lodge guest Millicent Kendall, who grips a document when she comes to a room. Peter pulls a gun on her and makes her burn it, unaware that it is actually a marriage license.

Millicent is a missing heiress, planning to elope with her fiancé. Peter forces her to spend the night in his cabin so as not to inform on his whereabouts. When she attempts to escape in the snow, he takes away one of her shoes.

A sheriff and his deputies begin a search for an actual fugitive, Dutch Nelson, and are mistaken for trappers by Peter, who fires a gun to scare them away. The lawmen respond with machine guns and tear gas. Peter reveals to Millicent that the warrant is just to force him to testify in a friend's divorce. As she falls in love with him, the real Dutch turns up.

Cast
 Don Ameche as Peter Nostrand
 Ann Sothern as Millicent Kendall
 Slim Summerville as Ed Henry
 Jane Darwell as Mrs. Henry
 John Qualen as Sheriff Dow
 Douglas Fowley as Dutch Nelson
 Allan Lane as Leroy Smedley
 Alan Dinehart as Jerome Kendall
 Stepin Fetchit as Percy
 Paul Hurst as Tom
 Spencer Charters as George Hession
 DeWitt Jennings as Captain Galloway
 Bradley Page as Pinelli
 Oscar Apfel as Smorgen
 John Hamilton as Captain Carroll
 Russell Hicks as Police Official
 Arthur Aylesworth as Deputy

Reviews

References

External links
 

1937 films
American romantic comedy films
1937 romantic comedy films
Films directed by Norman Taurog
20th Century Fox films
1930s English-language films
American black-and-white films
1930s American films